Donald Arthur Andrews (June 13, 1941 – October 22, 2010) was a Canadian correctional psychologist and criminologist who taught at Carleton University, where he was a founding member of the Institute of Criminology and Criminal Justice. He is recognized for having criticized Robert Martinson's influential paper concluding that "nothing works" in correctional treatment. He also helped to advance the technique of risk assessment to better predict the chance of recidivism among offenders. He is credited with coining the terms "criminogenic needs" and "risk-need-responsivity", both of which have since been used and studied extensively in the criminological literature.

Selected publications

References

External links

Faculty page

Canadian psychologists
Canadian criminologists
Academic staff of Carleton University
Carleton University alumni
Queen's University at Kingston alumni
1941 births
2010 deaths
People from Ottawa